Kevin Nylen (born August 14, 1981) is an American former soccer defender and current head coach of the Boston University Terriers men's soccer team.

Playing career
Nylen attended Saint Anselm College from 1999 to 2003. During this time he earned the school's Male Athlete of the Year honor, awarded annually to one student-athlete who best exemplifies the Saint Anselm spirit in leadership, scholarship and athletic achievements. Nylen played four seasons for the Hawks, serving as team captain in 2002. Upon graduating, Nylen began his professional career, spending three seasons with the Wilmington Hammerheads of the USL Second Division, before joining the Charleston Battery of the USL First Division for three seasons.

Coaching career
Nylen began his coaching career in August 2009 as an assistant coach at Amherst College. After one season, Nylen joined the Boston College Eagles in a similar role. During his first season at Boston College in 2010, the Eagles advanced to the semifinals of the Atlantic Coast Conference Tournament and earned one of the 27 at-large berths to the NCAA Championship. Nylen’s 2011 season at BC was even more of a success, as the Eagles advanced to the finals of the ACC Tournament marking the fifth-straight time that the squad made it to at least the semifinal stage. BC earned a berth into the NCAA Championship for the fifth-straight year. Nylen joined FIU's coaching staff in 2012 and has been with the team for four seasons. Nylen holds a United States Soccer Federation "A" coaching license as well as an NSCAA Advanced National diploma.

References

External links
Kevin Nylen profile at the Charleston Battery official website

1981 births
Living people
People from Ipswich, Massachusetts
Sportspeople from Essex County, Massachusetts
Soccer players from Massachusetts
Saint Anselm College alumni
Wilmington Hammerheads FC players
Charleston Battery players
USL First Division players
USL Second Division players
FIU Panthers men's soccer coaches
Association football defenders
American soccer players
American soccer coaches
Boston University Terriers men's soccer coaches